Agthirth  (or Agtheertha) is a village in the southern state of Karnataka, India. Administratively, it is under Agni gram panchayat, Shorapur Taluka of Yadgir District in Karnataka. Agthirth is 1.5 km by road east of the village of Agni, and 8.5 km by road west of the village of Baichbal.

See also
 Yadgir

References

External links 
 

Villages in Yadgir district